The 14th Kisei was a Go competition that took place in 1990. Koichi Kobayashi won the title 4 games to 1 over Hideo Otake.

Tournament

Challenger finals

Finals 

Kisei (Go)
1990 in go